Vallithode is a small hilly bazaar in Iritty taluk, Kannur district, Kerala, India.

Location
Vallithode is located on State Highway 30, the Thalassery – Coorg road, between Iritty and Koottupuzha, about 7 kilometres northeast of Iritty and about 5.7 kilometres from Ulikkal and 5 kilometres from the Kerala-Karnataka border.

Etymology
The word "Valli" means vine and "thode" means rivulet, thereby Vallithode means "vine bound rivulet" .

Transportation
The national highway passes through Kannur town.  Mangalore and Mumbai can be accessed on the northern side and Cochin and Thiruvananthapuram can be accessed on the southern side.  The road to the east of Iritty connects to Mysore and Bangalore.   The nearest railway station is Thalassery on Mangalore-Palakkad line. There are airports at Mangalore and Calicut.

The highway is scheduled for improvement.

References

External links
 http://www.iritty.com

Villages near Iritty